Diaper may refer to:
 Diaper, an absorbent garment
 Diaper (cloth), a fabric having a diamond-shaped pattern formed by alternating directions of thread.
 Diaper disposable In the 20th century, the disposable diaper was conceived. In the 1930s, Robinsons of Chesterfield had what were labeled "Destroyable Babies Napkins" listed in their catalogue for the wholesale market.
In 1944, Hugo Drangel of the Swedish paper company Pauliström suggested a conceptual design which would entail the placing of sheets of paper tissue (cellulose wadding) inside the cloth diaper and rubber pants.
 Diapering,  range of decorative patterns used in a variety of works of art, such as stained glass, heraldic shields, architecture, silverwork etc.
 "Diaper", a 1999 song by Meat Puppets from You Love Me
 Bertie Diaper (1909–1995), English footballer

See also 
 Diapir, a type of magma intrusion in geology